Anatoly Valentinovich Bogdanov (born 7 June 1981) is a Russian-Kazakhstani professional football coach and a former player, who played as a midfielder.

Career

Club
In January 2016, Bogdanov signed returned to FC Okzhetpes for a third stint at the club. He left the club at the end of the year and returned to Saint Petersburg, where he played for amateur teams STD Petrovich (2017), LAZ St. Petersburg (2018) and Dynamo St. Petersburg (2019).

International
Bogdanov made his first appearance for the Kazakhstan national team in 2012.

Career statistics

International

Statistics accurate as of match played 18 February 2014

References

External links

1981 births
Living people
Kazakhstan international footballers
Russian footballers
Russian expatriate footballers
Expatriate footballers in Kazakhstan
Kazakhstani people of Russian descent
FC Aktobe players
FC Shakhter Karagandy players
FC Tobol players
FC Okzhetpes players
FC Dynamo Saint Petersburg players
Kazakhstan Premier League players
Russian expatriate sportspeople in Kazakhstan
Footballers from Saint Petersburg
Association football midfielders
Kazakhstani footballers
Russian football managers
FC Dynamo Saint Petersburg managers